Terence Aidan (Terry) Halpin (born 1950s) is an Australian computer scientist who is known for his formalization of the Object Role Modeling notation.

Biography 
Born in Australia, Halpin studied at the University of Queensland starting in the 1970s and eventually received a BSc, DipEd, BA, MLitStud and in 1989 a PhD with the thesis "A logical analysis of information systems : static aspects of the data-oriented perspective" under John Staples.

In the 1970s he started working at the University of Queensland at the Key Centre for Software Technology at the Department of Computer Science, which he combined with some work in industry on database modeling.

In the 1990s he moved to industry heading the database research at multiple software companies, including Visio Corporation. When this company was acquired by Microsoft he became Program Manager in Database Modeling, and worked on the "conceptual and logical database modeling technology in Microsoft Visio for Enterprise Architects".

In the new millennium back in academia he was Professor at Neumont University, focusing on "business rules approach to informatics". In 2009 he switched back to industry becoming a Principal Scientist at LogicBlox, and became a part-time Professor at INTI International University in Malaysia.

Halpin is a member of IFIP WG 8.1 (Design and Evaluation of Information Systems). He has been editor for multiple academic journals. And he several workshops and conferences on modeling both industry and academia.

Work 
Halpin's research interest is in the field of "conceptual modeling and conceptual query technology for information systems, using a business rules approach".

Object-role modeling 
With his doctoral thesis Halpin (1989) formalized object-role modeling (ORM), a "method for designing and querying database models at the conceptual level, where the application is described in terms easily understood by non-technical users".,

Publications 
Halpin has authored several books and over 150 technical papers. A selection of books:
 1978. Inductive and Practical Reasoning. With Rod Girle, Corinne Miller & Geoff Williams. Rotecoge, 
 1981. Deductive Logic, 2nd edn. With Rod Girle. Logiqpress.
 1989. Conceptual Schema and Relational Database Design. With G.M. Nijssen. Prentice Hall, Sydney. 
 2001. Information Modeling and Relational Databases: From Conceptual Analysis to Logical Design. Morgan Kaufmann. .
 2001. Unified Modeling Language: Systems Analysis, Design and Development Issues. With Keng Siau (editors).
 2003. Database Modeling with Microsoft Visio for Enterprise Architects. With Ken Evans, Pat Hallock, & Bill MacLean. Morgan Kaufmann.
 2005. Information Modeling Methods and Methodologies. With John Krogstie and Keng Siau (editors).
 2008. Information Modeling and Relational Databases. Second Edition. With Tony Morgan. Morgan Kaufmann. .

References

External links 
 Terry Halpin homepage at orm.net

Year of birth missing (living people)
1950s births
Living people
Australian computer scientists
Computer science writers
Information systems researchers
Software engineers
Software engineering researchers
Academic staff of the University of Queensland
Microsoft employees